The  KNMY inscription (KAI 79 or CIS I 3785) is an inscription in the Punic language from Carthage that is believed to record a so-called "molk" child sacrifice. The text is inscribed on a 55 cm high stela that was discovered in 1922.

In this inscription KNMY, a Carthaginian slave (or "servant"), says that he "vowed" (nador) "his flesh" (BŠRY, cf. Hebrew beśarō) to the two major gods of Carthage, Tinnīt-Phanebal and Ba‘al-Ḥammon, which is understood to mean that he sacrificed a child of his (Krahmalkov translates BŠRY as "<this child> of his own flesh").

The name rendered in Punic as KNMY is not otherwise known. It is not Semitic, but probably Libyan or Berber. The inscription ends with a curse for those who might remove or damage the stela.

Text of the inscription
The inscription reads:

{|
|+ 
|-
| (line 1) || LRBT LTNT PN B‘L  || (Dedicated) to the Lady (to) Tinnīt-Phanebal
|-
| (2) || WL’DN LB‘L ḤMN || and to the Lord (to) Ba‘al-Ḥammon,
|-
| (3) || ’Š NDR KNMY  || is (the sacrifice) that KNMY vowed,
|-
| (3-5) || ‘/BD ’ŠMN‘MS / BN B‘LYTN || —the sl/ave of Esmûnamos / son of Ba‘alyaton—:
|-
| (5-6) || BŠ/RY || his fl/esh.
|-
| (6) || TBRK’  || May you (Tinnīt-Phanebal and Ba‘al-Ḥammon) bless him (KNMY)!
|-
| (6-8) || WK/L ’Š LSR T ’B/N Z || And any/one who (= if anyone) shall remove this st/one
|-
| (8) || BY PY ’NK || without the permission of myself
|-
| (8-10) || W/BY PY ’DM BŠ/MY || and / without the permission of someone in my n/ame,
|-
| (10-11) || WŠPṬ TNT PN / B‘L BRḤ ’DM H’|| then Tinnīt-Phanebal will condemn / the intent of that person!
|}

References

Punic inscriptions
KAI inscriptions